Jonathan Murphy may refer to:

Jonathan Murphy (actor), American actor
Jonathan Murphy (police officer) English police officer

See also
Jon Murphy (disambiguation)
John Murphy (disambiguation)